The Barcelona urban area  is an urban area in Catalonia (Spain) centered on the city of Barcelona and located less than 100 km south of the border with France. With a population of over 5 million, it is the most populous urban area on the Mediterranean coast, and one of the largest in Europe.

Overview
The urban area – the core of the metropolitan area – of Barcelona has a population of 4,604,000, being the fifth-most populous urban area in the European Union after Paris, the Ruhr area, Madrid and Milan. The Larger Urban Zone has a population of 4,440,629 according to Eurostat.

As stated by the Department of Economic and Social Affairs of United Nations, the metropolitan area of Barcelona has a population of 5,083,000, according to the Organisation for Economic Co-operation and Development it has a population of 4,900,000 and  according to the Eurostat it has a population of 5,375,774. According to Idescat it has a population of 5,029,181, according to BlatantWorld.com it has a population of 4,992,778 and according to World Gazetteer it has a population of 5,068,252.

The Zones

 First Zone: consists of other municipalities (outside Barcelona) in an official union of adjacent cities and municipalities called the Àrea Metropolitana de Barcelona (AMB) (also Greater Barcelona) with a population of 3,220,071 in area of 636 km2 (density 5,010 hab/km2).
 Second Zone: considered as urban and metropolitan adjacent area.  It forms a belt of cities: Vilanova i la Geltrú, Vilafranca del Penedès, Martorell, Terrassa, Sabadell, Granollers, Mataró and their respective areas of influence. The Generalitat projects the interconnection by means the Orbital Railway Line.
 Third Zone: considered territory of consolidated expansion. In this one the expansion passes to be of radial type, spreading across fluvial corridors or depressions, as in case of Manresa, Igualada and Vic, or continuing the coast, as in case of Blanes and El Vendrell.

Polynuclear Urban Region

According to the EURBANET project by Delft University of Technology it speaks about polynuclear urban region when there exists a series of important urban centers that relate intensely among them and to the exterior. This one is the case of bordering zones to the urban region that they extend around the cities of Tarragona and Girona. They are areas with a great economic dependence and services to the capital. They are narrow corridors well communicated to Barcelona, both by highway and railroad, which there fuse the metropolitan areas of these cities with the urban region. The PUR of Barcelona comprises 6,103,221 people in an area of 6,005 km2.

Barcelona Polynuclear Urban Region is conceived as "isolated islands of significant growth" which, may develop into zones of global economic integration. This is, however, not intended to happen at the cost of the global competitive position of the present core area.

Municipalities of metropolitan area - population and area

First zone

Second zone

Third zone

Municipalities of Polynuclear Urban Region - population and area

Tarragona area

Girona area

See also

Àmbit metropolità de Barcelona, one of the seven territories defined by the Regional Plan of Catalonia
Àrea Metropolitana de Barcelona (AMB) (also English Greater Barcelona),  integrated territorial executive bodies
Urban planning of Barcelona

References

Geography of Barcelona
Metropolitan areas of Spain